Henry Harrison Markham (November 16, 1840October 9, 1923) was an American lawyer and Republican politician.  He was the 18th governor of California (1891–1895), and represented California's 6th congressional district during the 49th United States Congress (1885–1887).  Earlier in life, he served as a Union Army officer in the American Civil War.

Early life 
On November 16, 1840, Markham was born in Wilmington, New York.

Career 
During the Civil War, Markham enlisted as a private in Company G, 32nd Wisconsin Infantry Regiment; he was promoted to second lieutenant. Markham was part of General William Tecumseh Sherman's March to the Sea in 1864. He was wounded at the Battle of Rivers' Bridge in 1865, and discharged.

After the war Markham returned to Wisconsin and settled in Milwaukee, where he studied law and passed the bar in 1867. He practiced law in Milwaukee in the state and federal courts. In 1879, Markham continued to practice law in Pasadena.

In 1890, Markham was elected as governor of California and inaugurated in January 1891.

In Pasadena Markham was on the school board and was one of the founders of the Pasadena public library. He was also part of the Calico Union Mining Company. During his run for governor he was referred to as "the dashing colonel from Pasadena." He was a long time member of the Pasadena Republican Club.

Personal life 
On May 17, 1876, Markham married Mary A. Dana (1853-1934) in Waukesha, Wisconsin. Markham purchased a 23 acre ranch in Pasadena, California. In 1879, Markham and his family moved to Pasadena, California. They have five daughters, Marie, Alice, Gertrude, Genevieve, and Hildreth. The Markham house was located at 703 S. Pasadena Ave. After elected as governor in 1891, Markham and his family moved to Sacramento, California. On October 9, 1923, Markham died in his home in Pasadena, California. Markham was 82 years old. Markham is interred in Mountain View Cemetery in Altadena.

References

 
Treasure from the Painted Hills: A History of Calico, California, 1882-1907, page 18,  By Douglas W. Steeples, David O. Whitten

External links

 
 Caltrans houses added to national listing for Markham Place Historic District at pasadenastarnews.com (2013)

1840 births
1923 deaths
Governors of California
People from Essex County, New York
People from Pasadena, California
People of Wisconsin in the American Civil War
Republican Party governors of California
Wisconsin Republicans
Republican Party members of the United States House of Representatives from California